Joe Thomasson (born August 16, 1993) is an American basketball player for Promitheas Patras of the Greek Basket League and the EuroCup. He plays the guard position.

Early and personal life
Thomasson was born in Dayton, Ohio. His parents are Joseph Thomasson and Autumn Bryant. He is 6' 4" (193 cm) tall, and weighs 165 pounds (75 kg).

Thomasson attended and played basketball at Thurgood Marshall High School ('12). His senior year he was the team captain and averaged 16 points per game, and was named All-Region.

College career
Thomasson then attended State Fair Community College. He played basketball there, veraged 14.2 points per game as a freshman, and was named Region 16 First Team. As a sophomore he averaged 18 points, six assists, and four rebounds a game, and was named a Junior College All American.

He attended and played basketball at Wright State University ('16). In 2014-15 Thomasson was second in the Horizon League with a .576 two-point field goal shooting percentage, and ninth in blocks, with 25. In 2015-16 he was fifth in the league with a .819 free throw percentage, sixth in the league in defensive rebounds, with 167, and seventh in assists, with 117. In 2016 he was named to the Horizon League All-Defensive Team.

Professional career
On August 5, 2019, he has signed with Baxi Manresa of the Liga ACB.

Thomasson played for Hapoel Gilboa Galil in the Israel Basketball Premier League, which he joined in May 2020.

On July 7, 2021, he has signed with Baxi Manresa of the Liga ACB.

On July 11, 2022, he signed with Russian powerhouse Zenit Saint Petersburg of the VTB United League. He deleted his Twitter account after other Twitter users criticized him for signing with a Russian team, in the wake of its invasion of Ukraine.

On January 7, 2023, Thomasson signed with Greek club Promitheas Patras for the rest of the season, replacing Joe Young.

References

External links
Wright State Raiders bio
Twitter page

1993 births
Living people
American expatriate basketball people in Greece
American expatriate basketball people in Israel
American expatriate basketball people in Poland
American expatriate basketball people in Romania
American expatriate basketball people in Russia
American expatriate basketball people in Spain
American men's basketball players
Basketball players from Dayton, Ohio
Bàsquet Manresa players
BC Zenit Saint Petersburg players
Guards (basketball)
Hapoel Gilboa Galil Elyon players
Israeli Basketball Premier League players
Junior college men's basketball players in the United States
Liga ACB players
Promitheas Patras B.C. players
Wright State Raiders men's basketball players